These are the official results of the Men's High Jump event at the 2003 World Championships in Paris, France. There were a total number of 32 participating athletes, with the final held on Monday 25 August 2003.

Medalists

Schedule
All times are Central European Time (UTC+1)

Abbreviations
All results shown are in metres

Results

Qualification
Qualification: 2.29 m (Q) or best 12 performances (q)

Final

See also
Athletics at the 2003 Pan American Games – Men's high jump
2003 High Jump Year Ranking

References

 Results(  2009-05-14)
 todor66

J
High jump at the World Athletics Championships